The 1958 Islington North by-election was a parliamentary by-election held on 15 May 1958 for the House of Commons constituency of Islington North in Islington, North London.

Background
The seat had become vacant when the sitting Labour Member of Parliament, Wilfred Fienburgh died on 3 February 1958, aged 38. He had held the seat since the 1951 general election.

Result
The result was a victory for the Labour Party candidate, Gerry Reynolds, who won with a majority of 7,461 votes over the Conservative candidate Ronald Bartle. Reynolds represented the constituency until his own death in 1969 at the age of 42, triggering another by-election.

References

 British Parliamentary by-elections

See also
Islington North (UK Parliament constituency)
Islington
1937 Islington North by-election
1969 Islington North by-election
List of United Kingdom by-elections

Islington North,1958
Islington North by-election
Islington North by-election
Islington North by-election
Islington North,1958